George P. Stevens (July 5, 1851 – 1927) was a member of the Wisconsin State Assembly.

Biography
Stevens was born on July 5, 1851, in Washington County, Wisconsin. In 1856, he moved with his parents to Monroe County, Wisconsin.

Career
Stevens was elected to the Assembly in 1902. Additionally, he served as Treasurer of Monroe County and a member of the Monroe County Board. He was a Republican.

References

External links

The Political Graveyard

People from Washington County, Wisconsin
People from Monroe County, Wisconsin
County supervisors in Wisconsin
Republican Party members of the Wisconsin State Assembly
1851 births
1927 deaths
Burials in Wisconsin